Grosz or Grósz is a surname of several possible origins. "Grosz" is a Polish-language surname originally used by Poles and Polish Jews derived either from the nickname from Polish "grosz", a coin, 1/100th of Polish zloty or from Polish spelling of German Groß, meaning "large". Grósz is a Hungarian language spelling of "Groß". Notable people with this surname include:

 Amihai Grosz (born 1979), Israeli violist
 Barbara J. Grosz (born 1948), American artificial intelligence pioneer
 Brian Grosz, American singer-songwriter
 Dave Grosz (1938–2018), Canadian football quarterback
 Dezső Grósz (1898–1987), Hungarian footballer
 Edith Grosz (1919–2011), American pianist and music educator based in Amsterdam
 Edward M. Grosz (born 1945), American prelate of the Roman Catholic Church
 Elizabeth Grosz (born 1952), feminist theorist
 George Grosz (1893–1959), German artist in the Dada and New Objectivist movements
 Gerald Grosz
 Gisella Grosz (1875–1942), Hungarian classical pianist
 István Grósz (1895–1944), Hungarian middle-distance runner
 Károly Grósz (1930–1996), Hungarian communist politician
 Marty Grosz (born 1930), German-born American jazz guitarist, banjoist, vocalist and composer
 Peter Grosz, American actor and television writer
 Stephen Grosz (born 1952), Britain author and psychoanalyst
 Terry Grosz
 Wilhelm Grosz (1894–1939), Austrian composer, pianist and conductor

References

Polish-language surnames
Germanic-language surnames
Jewish surnames